Olive Mount cutting, which was opened in 1830, is a  sandstone railway cutting on the line to Manchester,  from Liverpool. The railway's engineer, George Stephenson, had hoped to avoid the problem of creating the cutting for the Liverpool and Manchester Railway by routing the line further north. However, that plan was objected to by the Earl of Derby and the Earl of Sefton. 

In 1871, it was widened to allow four tracks to enter Liverpool Lime Street, because traffic had increased considerably since the station opened.

References

Sources

External links

 Signalling Record Society - Track and signalling diagram of Olive Mount junction, c.1972
Edge Hill Station

Rail transport in Liverpool
Railway cuttings in the United Kingdom